Stevens Farm and Stevens Hall redirect to here
Stevens House, Stevens Farm, and other variations may refer to the following locations in the United States:

 California
 Stevens House (Malibu, California), listed on the NRHP in Los Angeles County, California
Sherman Stevens House, Tustin, California, listed on the NRHP in Orange County, California

 Connecticut
William Stevens House (Clinton, Connecticut), NRHP-listed

 Delaware
William Stevens House (Kenton, Delaware), NRHP-listed

 Florida
Ann Stevens House, Lake Helen, Florida, NRHP-listed
Stevens-Gilchrist House, Sarasota, Florida, NRHP-listed

 Georgia
 Drane-Stevens House, Buena Vista, Georgia, listed on the NRHP in Marion County, Georgia
 Dasher-Stevens House, Macon, Georgia, listed on the NRHP in Bibb County, Georgia

 Idaho
Arnold Stevens House, Jerome, Idaho, NRHP-listed

 Illinois
 Stevens House (Tiskilwa, Illinois), listed on the NRHP in Bureau County, Illinois

 Indiana
Levi Stevens House, Aurora, Indiana, NRHP-listed

 Maine
Abiel Stevens House, North Andover, Maine, NRHP-listed
John Calvin Stevens House, Portland, Maine, listed on the NRHP in Maine
 Goodale–Stevens Farm, Ogunquit, Maine, listed on the NRHP in York County, Maine

 Massachusetts
 Conkey-Stevens House, Amherst, Massachusetts, NRHP-listed
Daniel Stevens House, Worcester, Massachusetts, NRHP-listed

 Michigan
Andrew J. Stevens House, Kalamazoo, Michigan, listed on the NRHP in Kalamazoo County, Michigan

 Minnesota
John Harrington Stevens House, Minneapolis, Minnesota, listed on the NRHP in Hennepin County, Minnesota

 Mississippi
Stevens-Buchanan House, Brandon, Mississippi, listed on the NRHP in Rankin County, Mississippi

 Montana
Dominic Stevens House, Lodge Grass, Montana, listed on the NRHP in Big Horn County, Montana

 Nebraska
Wes Stevens Site, Potter, Nebraska, listed on the NRHP in Cheyenne County, Nebraska

 New Jersey
Edwin A. Stevens Hall, Hoboken, New Jersey, NRHP-listed
Israel Stevens House, Lawrence, New Jersey, listed on the NRHP in Mercer County, New Jersey

  New Hampshire
Stevens Memorial Hall, Chester, New Hampshire, NRHP-listed

 New York
 Dr. Buck-Stevens House, Brasher Falls, New York, NRHP-listed
John Stevens House, Mount Vernon, New York, NRHP-listed
H. R. Stevens House, New City, New York, NRHP-listed
 Stevens House (Astoria, New York), historic home of Major General Ebenezer Stevens in New York

  North Carolina
Everitt P. Stevens House, Selma, North Carolina, NRHP-listed

 Oregon
Charles Stevens House, Astoria, Oregon, NRHP-listed

 South Carolina
Stevens-Dorn Farmstead, Saluda, South Carolina, NRHP-listed

  South Dakota
Stevens Opera Block, Delmont, South Dakota, listed on the NRHP in Douglas County, South Dakota
Stevens Ranch, Piedmont, South Dakota, listed on the NRHP in Meade County, South Dakota

 Texas
Elisha Stevens House, Cuero, Texas, listed on the NRHP in DeWitt County, Texas

  Utah
Sidney Stevens House, North Ogden, Utah, listed on the NRHP in Weber County, Utah

  Washington
 Stevens Hall (Pullman, Washington), listed on the NRHP in Whitman County, Washington

See also
 Stephens House (disambiguation)
 William Stevens House (disambiguation)
 Stevens Building (disambiguation)
 Stevens School (disambiguation)
 Stevens High School (disambiguation)